Started in 1986, the Polar Bear Jump-Off is an annual event held in Seward, Alaska to raise money for the American Cancer Society.  Money is raised by participants who collect pledges and jump into the frigid waters of Seward's small boat harbor just off of Resurrection Bay.  Jumpers often dress in entertaining costumes.  The event has grown larger over the years and now includes a silent auction, turkey bowling, a carnival, and parade.

This jump-off went virtual in 2021.

References

Tourist attractions in Seward, Alaska
American Cancer Society
Cancer fundraisers
Annual events in Alaska